Fereej Mohammed Bin Jasim is a district in Qatar, located in the municipality of Ad Dawhah. It is bordered by Mushayrib, which it shares Zone 3 with.

The name is derived from Mohammed bin Jassim Al Thani.

References

Communities in Doha